This is a list of programs that have been and are being broadcast by VTC Digital Television, belonging to the Voice of Vietnam.

VTC1

Khoảnh khắc Vàng (tiền thân của Thời sự Tổng hợp)
Sao Online
Gia đình Online
Khúc hát quê hương 
Tôi 20
Di sản văn minh thế giới 
Khúc vọng xưa 
Tạp chí tổng hợp khai thác
Đêm thời trang
Thời trang Việt Nam 
Cửa sổ công nghệ 
Các nhà văn Việt Nam 
Khai thác đặc sắc
Hộp thư VTC
Phim điện ảnh thể thao 
Gương mặt trang bìa
Chương trình ca nhạc 
Thế giới ẩm thực
Chuyện doanh nhân
Lời muốn nói
Thần đồng đất Việt
Miss Audition
Bí mật thế kỷ
Bản tin thời tiết
Thị trường Việt
Doanh nghiệp 24G (phát sóng song song với BTV3)
Con người & tự nhiên
Gia đình Online
Bản tin 113
Di sản kiến trúc
Không gian Việt
Sóng nhạc K-Pop
Tạp chí điện ảnh trẻ
Tạp chí bất động sản
Doanh nhân cuối tuần
Doanh nhân & cộng đồng
Xứng danh bộ đội cụ Hồ
Xã hội thông tin
Góc cười
Điện ảnh trẻ
Nhịp điệu trẻ
Doanh nghiệp số
Thế giới trẻ
Đẹp +
Chặng đường xanh
Góc nhìn không gian
Bản tin Giờ vàng
An toàn giao thông
Lần theo dấu vết
Thế giới điện ảnh
Thế giới giải trí
Bất động sản 24h
Đêm của bóng đá
Alo bác sĩ
Trên sàn Catwalk
Miền đất lạ
Đời sống giải trí
Chứng khoán 7 ngày qua
8 lạng nửa cân
Mẹ tuyệt vời nhất
Thể thao 24h
Chị và em
Giai điệu điện ảnh

Nhịp sống thể thao
Trạng cờ Quý Tỵ
Thời sự tổng hợp (phát sóng song song với VTC2 (2009 – 2011); VTC5 (2008) & VTC14 (2009 – 2013)
Thông tin thị trường
Nóng trên mặt báo
Giờ tin sáng
Góc nhìn cuộc sống
Đa chiều
Khúc tình ca
Bản tin sáng
Bản tin chiều
Bản tin đêm
Bản tin cuối ngày
Góc nhìn thẳng
Bản tin kinh tế
Địa ốc 24h
Sức khỏe cộng đồng
Sản phẩm và tiêu dùng
Kinh tế và tiêu dùng 
Nông thôn chuyển động
Cà phê tối
Giai điệu ngày mới
Billboard
Điểm báo
Bài hát của tôi
Điểm đến
Khám phá thế giới
Con người và tự nhiên 
Hồ sơ vụ án 
Tạp chí bóng đá thế giới
Tạp chí Golf
Gõ cửa phim trường
Người bán hàng chuyên nghiệp
Nhịp cầu nhân ái
Music Faces
Đất & người Miền Trung
Tạp chí kinh tế cuối tuần
Tiêu điểm thể thao
Lần theo dấu vết
Phiêu lưu cùng ẩm thực
Đảng đổi mới & phát triển
Truyền hình xanh
Khám phá thương hiệu 
Bác sĩ gia đình 
Chân dung cuộc sống
Vẻ đẹp Việt
VTC Không khoảng cách
Ô tô xe máy
Tuổi thần tiên
Con ong chăm chỉ
Cẩm nang gia đình
Diễn đàn lập pháp
Nhất nghệ tinh
Truyền hình thời đại số
Một vòng Online
Đi và trải nghiệm
Tôi khác mỗi ngày
Hành trình tri thức Việt
Tư vấn sức khỏe
Thông điệp từ quá khứ
Thị trường chứng khoán
Nốt nhạc trẻ
Thương hiệu Việt
Thương hiệu và thị trường 
Mỗi ngày 1 phong cách
Sống phong cách 
Người nổi tiếng
Thế giới ẩm thực
Thế giới Adam
Tạp chí điện ảnh
Ống kính du lịch
Tạp chí cuối tuần 
Tạp chí Nhịp Mode
Nhân tài đất Việt 
Cuộc sống tươi đẹp
Nhịp sống Châu Âu
Tóc và trang điểm
Một nửa thế giới
Khám phá thế giới 
Trò chuyện cuối tuần
Giao diện số
Còn mãi với thời gian
Đảng trong đổi mới và phát triển doanh nghiệp
Đàn ông muốn nói
Phong cách
Tư liệu thể thao
Chân trời du học 
Khu vườn tuổi thơ
Giai điệu điện ảnh
Văn hóa cuối tuần 
Văn hóa Mobile 
Nhịp sống Online 
25 phong cách ấn tượng
10 phút cập nhật
Hành trình rẻo cao
Phim tài liệu khoa học
Top Ten
Không gian âm nhạc
Chúng ta ăn gì
Nhật ký chống dịch COVID-19
Tạp chí du lịch
Billboard Thể thao
iMusic Top Hits
Đến với nghệ thuật thứ 7
Sành điệu
Bản tin văn hóa
Alo bác sĩ 24
Rap Kids
Bản tin trưa
Bản tin thể thao 
Bản tin tối
Chuyện trong ngày
Tin quốc tế
Bản tin thể thao
Tin đầu giờ (9h, 11h, 15h, 16h)
Phim truyện
Bình luận bóng đá
Tin nóng
Tin nhanh
Cuộc sống 24h (phát sóng song song với VTC14)
Chào buổi tối (phát sóng song song với VTC14)
Thế giới nghiêng
Góc nhìn khán giả
Đường dây nóng
Phim tài liệu
Tạp chí Biên giới – Biển đảo
Việt Nam Online (phát sóng song song với VTC2 (2009 – 2011); VTC5 (2008); & VTC14 (2009 – 2013) 
10 phút cập nhật
Xe+
Sống kết nối
Học nghề ở đâu?
Giờ hướng nghiệp
22h + II
Góc nhìn
Sống khỏe thế kỷ 21
Phiêu lưu cùng Gulliver
Sự kiện tuần tới
Nhịp sống mới
Góc cuộc sống
Cool & Break
Giờ thứ 9
360 độ Showbiz
Bài hát Mộc
Tạp chí kinh tế & tiêu dùng
Giải mã
Nóng dư luận
Giờ sức khỏe
Quang Huy bình luận
Trao cơ hội – Nối ước mơ
Nhịp đập thị trường
Bếp hồng 
Tiêu điểm thị trường 
Từ nông thôn nhìn ra thế giới 
Tự soi tự sửa
Tạp chí thương hiệu và thị trường
Phố bất động sản

VTC2

Movies channel + VTC Olympic, VLife (2004-2008)

Phim truyện
Phim truyện cuối tuần
Thế giới điện ảnh
Hành tinh số
Hi Fashion
Thể thao

Technology channel + #Kenh2 & Redius TV (2008-now)

Con đường sức khỏe
100 câu hỏi vì sao của bé
Go Music
Emovies (Tiền thân của Phim +)
Let's Go
Tuần này ai lên sóng
Cuộc sống đích thực
Thế giới Mobile
Học nghề ở đâu?
Giờ hướng nghiệp
Đổi mới sáng tạo Việt Nam
Đẹp hơn mỗi ngày
Tuần công nghệ
Góc khám phá
Ai là ai
Lets Go
Phong cách số
Thiên tài nhí
Cafe @
Chat với 8x
eMovies
Sao băng 
Thời sự STI (Thời sự ICT)
Đỉnh cao công nghệ
F5 Refresh
Bạn có thể?
Những công dân @
Thế giới xe
Xã hội thông tin
Thế giới Mobile
Kho vàng tri thức
My Playlist
Bóng đá FIFA Online
Thời sự ICT (Tiền thân của Thời sự STI)
Thế giới là 8
Inbox
Người bán hàng chuyên nghiệp
Bác sĩ máy tính
Thế giới xe
Hành tinh số
Báo chí Online
Tạp chí Fifa Online
Tạp chí thể thao điện tử
World Cup Fifa Online
Phổ cập tin học cộng đồng 
Thời sự tổng hợp (phát sóng song song với VTC1 & VTC14)
Truyền hình thời đại số
10 phút cập nhật 
Ngộ nghĩnh
Nhân vật sự kiện thông tin truyền thông 
Báo cuối tuần
Địa chỉ ngân hà
Người tìm đường
Lần theo dấu vết
Vietnam Top Ringtons
Thử thách cực đại
Những kỷ lục thế giới
Việt Nam Online (phát sóng song song với VTC1 & VTC14)
Xổ số Kiến thiết Miền Bắc (trực tiếp lúc 18h; 2011 – 2012)
Bản tin Techspot
Re – Why?
The Start Up Bulbs
Start-Up 101 Series
Techdoor – Cánh cửa công nghệ
Việt Nam 4.0
Kết nối chuyển giao công nghệ
Nhịp sống mới 
Alô bác sĩ 24
Sống kết nối
Phim +
22h + II
Giai điệu thao trường
Xe+
Sống khỏe thế kỷ 21
Giờ sức khỏe
Kinh tế số
Góc nhìn người tiêu dùng
No Comment
Tôi khác mỗi ngày
Giải mã
Thế giới động vật
Ấn tượng Việt Nam
Nhịp sống mới
Khám phá Việt Nam
Top Vietnam
Di sản văn hóa
Thế giới xe xanh
Tình huống nguy hiểm – Thử thách khắc nghiệt
Chinh phục máy tính 
Khởi nghiệp
Bản tin COVID-19
Xu hướng 24h
Một vòng online
Vòng tay yêu thương
Đấu trường cờ Việt
Trạng cờ Quý Tỵ
Điểm nóng đời sống công nghệ
Đầu tư cùng Start up
Ấn tượng Việt
Góc nhìn chiến tranh

VTC3

Tư vấn sức khỏe
Tường thuật bóng đá
Phim truyện
Thể thao 365
Ngôi sao ngày ấy
Bóng đá thế giới tuần qua
Tạp chí thể thao tổng hợp 
Toàn cảnh bóng đá thế giới
Tạp chí Boxing
Tạp chí đua xe
Tạp chí cúp C1
Tạp chí Golf
Tạp chí phụ nữ và thể thao
Tạp chí bóng đá thế giới
Tạp chí bóng đá châu Á
Tạp chí bóng đá 5 châu
Tạp chí bóng chày
Tạp chí thể dục dụng cụ
Huyền thoại thể thao
Thể thao mạo hiểm
Tạp chí quần vợt
Thế giới Ngoại hạng Anh 
Lịch sử thể thao thế giới
Ấn tượng bóng đá Việt Nam
Ấn tượng thể thao 
Thế giới những người khổng lồ
Bình luận thể thao
Những ngôi sao Olympic Bắc Kinh 2008
Bình luận chuyên đề 
Cảm xúc thể thao
Tạp chí thể thao
Bình luận chuyên đề
Sống khỏe mỗi ngày
Hỏi đáp bác sĩ
Alô bác sĩ 24
Phiêu lưu cùng ẩm thực
Đi và trải nghiệm
No Comment
Tôi khác mỗi ngày
Con ong chăm chỉ
Điểm đến
Thế giới động vật
Giải mã
Góc nhìn
Sống khỏe thế kỷ 21
Xe+
Bí ẩn chưa lời giải
Doanh nghiệp và thương hiệu
Con đường thể thao
Thể thao Zoom
Thể thao 24h
Cool & Break
Vòng quay bóng đá Việt Nam
Tường thuật thể thao
Tường thuật bóng đá
Tường thuật Futsal
3S+ (Sports, Showbiz, Social Media+)
Giờ giải trí
Xu hướng 24h
Xổ số Vietlott
Điểm đến
Sống khỏe mỗi ngày 
Thanh

MobiTV, Cattiensa

Gameshow Cattiensa + Program relay from AVG
Không phải ai cũng biết
Thử thách đường phố
Đường pitch

ON Sports +

On Sport News
Thế giới thể thao
Thể thao Việt Nam
Tường thuật bóng đá
Tường thuật V.League
V.League Replay
Sắc màu Văn hóa – Giải trí
Camera On
Cảnh báo tội phạm
Cảnh báo từ cuộc sống

VTC4

Phát lại các chương trình của VTC
Khúc tình ca
Giai điệu quê hương
Sân khấu cải lương
Gia đình Online
Bứt phá môn tiếng Anh thi THPT với VNU-IS
Đẹp +
Điểm hẹn Đồng Nai
Doanh nghiệp và thương hiệu 
Quả táo đỏ
Thời trang phương tiện
Tóc mây môi hồng

Yeah1TV + Yeah1 Family

For You
1+1=1
51 Job
Bring It
A2Z
Alo Alo
Style Star
If You Can - Nếu bạn có thể
Trước ống kính
Chinh phục
Style+
Đùa một chút
Phim truyện
Bé làm người lớn
Câu chuyện âm nhạc
Hát hay, hay hát
Photographer show
Làn sóng Hàn Quốc
Tín đồ Shopping
Sổ tay phong cách
Thư viện hits
Cửa sổ V-Pop
Kiến thức Fashion
V Music
Giới trẻ vào bếp
Valy âm nhạc
Playlist – Nhạc theo chủ đề
Căn phòng số 8
Phong cách thảm đỏ
Khoảnh khắc thay đổi số phận
Leo Show
Cơn bão 8
Teen Sports
Style Star
Chinh phục lọ lem
4 ngày yêu
Bật mí bí mật sao
Thật và thách 
Hát tự nhiên
Này bạn, bạn nghĩ sao
K Music
Tôi làm DJ
Jukeon
Cửa sổ âm nhạc
Nấu ăn cùng sao
Làn sóng Hàn Quốc 
Gương mặt ảnh bìa
Yeah1 Music
Thời trang người nổi tiếng 
Sống để yêu nhau
Đẹp mỗi ngày

VTC5

Bạn có thể?
Cafe @
Thông điệp từ quá khứ
Xe 360°
Bí ẩn không xa lạ
Doanh nghiệp 24G
Thế giới Mobile
Xã hội thông tin
Thế giới GAME
Chat với 8x
Hành tinh số
Chiếc hộp âm nhạc
Văn hóa Game
Hội tụ số
Nhạc cổ điển
Di sản kiến trúc
Khoa học kỳ thú
Chuyện lạ
Ngộ nghĩnh
Thế giới quanh ta
Nhật ký bác sĩ
Địa chỉ thiên hà
Thời sự tổng hợp (phát sóng song song với VTC1)
Khoảnh khắc vàng (phát sóng song song với VTC1)
Bản tin Giờ vàng
Việt Nam online (phát sóng song song với VTC1)
Doanh nghiệp 24h (phát lại từ VTC1)
Thông điệp cuộc sống
Đêm của game
Phim truyện
Go Music (phát lại từ VTC2)
Hành tinh mãi xanh
Khoa học kỳ thú
Khi bé hỏi tại sao
Khám phá
Lần theo dấu vết
Hành tinh Eureka

VBC

Phim truyện
Album Online
Hành trình bốn phương
Chuyện bốn phương
Cán cân công lý
Cẩm nang cuộc sống
10 sự kiện đáng chú ý tuần qua
Giải mã tội ác
Group X – Khỏe & năng động
Nhảy cùng Fimbles
Bác sĩ tình yêu
Mở cửa trái tim
Chuyện to chuyện nhỏ
Chuyện của sao
Chuyện bốn phương 
Điểm hẹn cuối tuần
Yoga cho thai phụ
Đại hội võ lâm
Sắc màu tình bạn
Siêu đầu bếp 
Top V Clip
Phụ nữ thời đại
Phù thủy tóc
Lương y có như từ mẫu 
Pháp luật và cuộc sống 
VBC Cười
Ô cửa ABC
Hoa khéo tay
Hoàng tử bóng đá – Soccer Prince
10 sự kiện dở nhất tuần qua
Những giá trị của thời gian
Khỏe đẹp mỗi ngày
Giai điệu trẻ
Tin tức đó đây
Úm ba la...măm măm
Anh hùng tứ phương
Hẹn hò bí mật
Tin tức giải trí
Cửa sổ thứ 7
1357
Bà kể cháu nghe
Hoa khéo tay
113 online
Top Hit Music
VBC Music
Nhịp sống hôm nay
Vì sự nghiệp trồng người
Bước chân thần tốc
Music Stories
Music Theme
Sức khỏe vàng
Yoga của tôi
Sức sống những bài ca
Blog âm nhạc
Sắc màu không gian
Timeless Melody
Sao 360
Hát cùng VBC
Giả mạo nhân tài
Tiếng nói người dân 
Tiếng nói doanh nghiệp 
1000 kiểu chết
Giai điệu thần tiên  
Doctor Who
Nghệ sĩ và ẩm thực
Vườn tuổi thơ
Phong cách thời trang 
PNJ Sliver Stars

SofaTV

Phim truyện
Nụ cười vàng
SĐẹp
Nhanh vào bếp
Tận hưởng cuộc sống
Điểm hẹn du lịch

TVBlue

Vô địch hài
V Playlist
Bạn có bình thường? (phát lại)
Trẻ em luôn đúng
Nhịp đập K-pop
Đánh thức cơ thể
Khám phá ASEAN
Vị khách bí ẩn
Món ăn của ngôi sao
Ẩm thực bốn phương
Taxi Show
Đại chiến Rapper
Nhóm nhạc Stray Kids
Ca sĩ ẩn danh
Thử tài Yang Nam
Học viện thần tượng
Mộc
Giọng hát bí ẩn
Đấu trường âm nhạc – 101 – Produce 101
Bếp nhà làm
Tân tây du ký
Đẹp cùng sao Hàn
Đánh thức cơ thể
Phim truyền hình

SCTV

Cười đa cảm xúc
Tour de Vietnam
Sống ở Việt Nam
Chuyến xe mê ly
Làng nghệ Việt (phát lại từ VOVTV)
Sách và cuộc sống (phát lại từ VOVTV)
Về chốn linh thiêng (phát lại từ VOVTV)

VTC6
Tư vấn sức khỏe 
Chuyên gia của bạn 
Khỏe đẹp cùng chuyên gia
Điện ảnh trẻ
Sống khỏe mỗi ngày
Đưa nghị quyết vào cuộc sống 
Văn hóa tâm linh Việt
TVShopping Queen
Dòng chảy sông Hồng
Chuyên gia của bạn
Alô bác sĩ 24
Xu hướng 24h
Music Home
Bản tin xanh
Mỗi ngày một làn điệu 
Phim truyện
Xổ số Vietlott 
Qua miền Tây Bắc
Tiêu dùng 24/7
Tiến tới Đại hội XIII của Đảng
Văn hóa tâm linh Việt
Con là để yêu
Doanh nghiệp và cuộc sống
Vươn cao Việt Nam
Tôi khác mỗi ngày
Dạy hát chèo trên truyền hình
Hành trình hạnh phúc
Tiêu dùng thông minh
Sức khỏe vàng
Nhịp sống mới
Hát cùng đam mê
Chân dung nghệ sĩ
Nhà mát
Chào buổi tối
Giải mã
Đấu trường cờ Việt

Saigon Channel

Phim truyện Việt Nam
Phim truyện nước ngoài
Ống kính du học
Blog Music
Thế giới đa sắc màu
Sắc màu Sài Gòn
Doanh nghiệp và sự kiện
Thế giới số
Góc lạ quen
Không gian đa chiều
Địa ốc & đô thị
Phim hoạt hình
Phim kinh điển
Phim Châu Á
Phim Quốc tế
Điện ảnh thế giới
15 phút điểm tin quốc tế
Clip của tôi
Khóa Sol
Bé yêu
Người giữ lửa
Phim tài liệu
CEO Talk
Business to Finance
Tạp chí kinh tế cuối tuần
Góc nhìn thể thao
Clip của tôi
Những ngôi sao nhỏ 
B2F

VTC7

Sân khấu
Phim truyện
Bình luận bóng đá

Today TV

Today Life
Tôi yêu chợ Việt
Tôi là hoa hậu hoàn vũ Việt Nam
Kinh tế cuối tuần
Ẩm thực đại chiến
Tạp chí địa ốc
Nói vui mua nhiều 
Những khúc vọng xưa
Sao Online (chuyển sóng từ VTC)
Tổ ấm yêu thương
Chiếc cân may mắn
Một phút tỏa sáng
Xổ số Vietlott
Cứ nói đi
Hãy đồng ý
Hương vị ẩm thực
Nhà đẹp quanh ta
Trạng cờ Quý Tỵ (chuyển sóng từ VTC)
Ống kính thời trang
Trạng cờ đất việt
Khỏe và đẹp
Xổ số các tỉnh miền Nam
Dự báo thời tiết
Hi 5
San sẻ yêu thương
Tám là chính 
Vòng tay yêu thương
Tri kỷ
Làm mẹ
Chuyện nhà mình
Sống để yêu thương
Dr. You – Sức khỏe cho mọi nhà
Khát vọng đông quê
Vươn tới ước mơ
360 độ làm đẹp
Bữa tối của Bòn Bon
Today Playlist
Today Sport
Today House
Today-M
Quà tặng giờ vàng 
Phút thư giãn
Ẩm thực độc đáo
Bước nhảy xì tin
Nhịp điệu cuộc sống
Tài năng Việt
Thế giới nhà bếp
Today Music
Cẩm nang sống
Tôi đồng ý
Đẹp mỗi ngày
Dự báo thời tiết
Hạnh phúc bất ngờ
Lữ khách 24h
Gia đình tài tử
Thử tài thiết kế nội thất
Tivi Shopping
Đẹp không giới hạn
Cảnh báo an toàn sống
Phim truyện
Today 18h
Ngẫu hứng âm nhạc
Người vẽ ước mơ
Cười lên nào – Just For Laughs Gags
Thế giới điện ảnh
Tư vấn sức khỏe
Let Me In – Tự tin tỏa sáng
Mẹ yêu bé
Tư vấn sức khỏe & tiêu dùng
Nhỏ to cùng mẹ
Thế giới âm nhạc
Trải nghiệm và tin dùng
Tiếp sức hồi sinh
Mảnh ghép cuộc đời
Vũ điệu cuộc sống
Hành trình lột xác
Hóng chuyện
Xuân này tết xưa
Đặc sản miền Tây 
Tết nay làm gì
Ấm tình lòng xuân
Mỹ vị 24
Nhất gia bách truyện
Cơm ngon con khỏe
Tư vấn sức khỏe và tiêu dùng
Cùng hát cùng chơi
Trò chuyện cùng chuyên gia (talkshow)
MTV Chat Attack 
Gia vị yêu thương

VTC8

VITV

Hàn thử biểu
Đối thoại
Hộp tin Việt Nam
Tâm chấn
Tạp chí Xây dựng và Bất động sản
Giờ thứ 9
Tiêu điểm
Tin mới
Bản tin Xuất nhập khẩu
Bữa sáng doanh nhân
Năng động châu Á
Bàn tròn doanh nghiệp
Chuyển động châu Âu
Vòng xoáy châu Mỹ
Điểm sóng – Hot Stock
Luật sư của doanh nghiệp
Tiêu điểm vàng
Kinh tế toàn cầu
Câu chuyện thời trang
Diễn đàn CEO
Tiêu điểm kinh tế
Thế giới sự kiện
Tạp chí ngân hàng
Khám phá thương hiệu
Việt Nam & tiềm năng
Môi trường kinh doanh
V Tài chính
Trên từng kinh tuyến
Chứng khoán ngành
Into Vietnam
100° Fashion
Thư viện doanh nhân
ART World
Hành trình tri thức
Thế giới kỳ quan
Tạp chí Golf
Sắc màu muôn phương 
VITV Gặp gỡ

ViewTV

Sắc màu muôn phương
Báo chí Kinh tế tuần qua
Kinh tế tuần qua
Luật sư doanh nghiệp
Vietnam – EU Biz
Chứng khoán cuối tuần
Chuyên đề Tài chính thuế
Thể thao tuần qua
Hành trình âm nhạc
Đế chế thời trang
Một vòng Showbiz
Lời hồi đáp
Chạm
Tối nay 8 giờ
Bản tin View 24
Đổi mới để phát triển
Phát triển kinh tế xã hội miền núi biên giới và hải đảo
Vì chủ quyền biên giới biển đảo quốc gia
Đất Phương Nam
Kỹ năng sống
Nhật ký hành trình
Hộp bí mật
Nhật Bản ẩm thực du hí
Tám là chín
Lăng kính nhỏ
10 phút thử thách
Hội hâm mộ showbiz
Đẹp ư ? đơn giản
W.O.W Nicole
Tips 10 – Sổ tay gia đình trẻ
Để đó chồng lo
Chuyển động Nhật Bản
Nấu ăn cùng Ochikeron
Quán quen món ruột
Ứng dụng tương lai
Chất như người Nhật
Nghe cầu vồng nói
Showbiz 101
Một vòng Xi nê
Irasshaimase Sài Gòn
Nhật ngữ trong nháy mắt
Top Ten
Ongaku – Vui với âm nhạc

VTC

Lớp học không khoảng cách
Thành Lương Live
Quang Huy bình luận
Phát lại các chương trình từ các kênh VTC

VTC9

VTC Olympic 2008 + VTC9

Bình luận Olympic
Phát lại các chương trình ca nhạc cổ của VTC

Let's Viet

Let's Cà phê
Góc nhân ái
Cà phê sáng
Tiêu điểm
Một chuyến đi
Mới và nóng 
Câu chuyện thế giới
Siêu thị cuộc sống
Đêm Sài Gòn
Bệ phóng tài năng
Let's Music – Âm nhạc tương tác
TV Champion
Võ đài chiến thắng
MAX Muay Thái
Đấu trường bò - The Battle (The Cow Fight)
Tần số âm nhạc
Thai FIGHT
Trò chơi truyền hình xuyên Quốc gia – The Biggest Game Show in the World
Người Việt Nam chinh phục đỉnh Everest
Xổ số Kiến thiết Miền Nam
Xổ số Kiến thiết Miền Bắc 
Sự cố bất ngờ - Kadeedad (คดีเด็ด)
Hãy nghe họ nói
Thế giới trong mắt trẻ thơ
Đêm của sao
Nhiệt kế giải trí
Thế giới trẻ
Cùng là tỷ phú 
Phóng sự thực tế
Sắc màu giải trí
Việt Nam Online (phát lại từ VTC1)
Ngược dòng thời gian
Đếm ngược AEC
Chuyện lý chuyện tình
Nước sạch cho em
Khi trái bóng lăn
Nhịp cầu ước mơ
Thế giới phụ nữ
Chuyện phái đẹp 
Let's phim Việt
Luật đời vay trả
Gia đình yêu thương
Mai Vàng kết nối
Những mảnh ghép cuộc đời
Xe và thể thao
Người tập sự châu Á – The Apprentice
U-League
Lục lạc vàng
Sống xanh
Đồng đội 4 chân
Vọng cổ du ca
Khúc quân hành mùa hè xanh
Nhiếp ảnh tranh tài – Photo Face Off
Những điều bí ẩn
Người nổi tiếng
Đẹp cùng Perfect Call
Let's Viet News
Let's Viet Talk
Hành trình đỏ
Chinh phục sa mạc
Mái ấm PNJ
Mẹo vặt cuối tuần

VTC

Cà phê ngày mới
Tọa đàm
Phim truyện
Nói về cuộc sống
Phóng sự
Xổ số kiến thiết miền Bắc (phát trực tiếp tại Hà Nội)
Chuyện thế giới
Giờ thứ 9
Khai phá vẻ đẹp của bạn
22+ II
360 độ Showbiz
Alo bác sĩ đây
V Music Show
Sách và cuộc sống 
Về chốn linh thiêng

VTC10

IMusic

IMusic Việt Nam 
Imusic Quốc tế
Imusic Top Hits
Imusic Shows 
IStock

VSky

Chương trình tổng hợp 
Phim truyện

Netviet + VTC

Open Vietnam
Open Vietnam: Sharing Vietnam
Open Vietnam: Việt Nam hội nhập và phát triển bền vững
Việt Nam ngày nay 
Việt Nam biển bạc
Vietnam Journal
Sóng nhạc trẻ
Người xa quê
Làng nghề
Bầu trời bé thơ
Nhịp cầu Việt Mỹ
Người Việt trẻ
Tour de Vietnam
Next Việt Model
Focus in Vietnam
Nhịp cầu NetViet
Nhịp cầu quê hương 
NetViet Stories
Những miền quê Việt
Tour de Vietnam
Sống ở Việt Nam
Vẻ đẹp tự nhiên
Mỗi tuần một người đẹp
Phong cách của các sao
Cầu vồng âm nhạc
Talk chủ nhật
Đánh thức vị giác
Thời trang bốn mùa
Văn hóa Việt
Hành trình tri thức Việt
Kết nối thương hiệu Việt
Việt Nam và thế giới
Phim truyện
Di sản văn hóa
Văn hóa ẩm thực Việt
Top Vietnam
Ngon và lành
Bản tin tối
Nhịp cầu giao thương
Người Việt năm châu
Việt Nam hội nhập
Việt Nam góc nhìn của bạn
Một ngày làm người Việt
Tiềm năng Việt Nam
Dạy Tiếng Việt cơ bản
Người Việt bốn phương
Văn hoá ẩm thực
Đường đến thành công
Ấn tượng Việt Nam
Góc cuộc sống
Nhịp sống mới
Phim tài liệu
Khám phá Việt Nam
Bản tin tiếng Anh
Nhịp sống trẻ
Góc nhìn nhà đầu tư
Đường tới thành Rome
Lịch sử Việt Nam 
Tiếng Việt
Gameshow 
Trúc xanh
Mã số bí mật
Gia đình Việt
Nhịp sống mới
Ẩm thực cuối tuần
Tiêu điểm thị trường 
Những điều kỳ thú tại Hàn Quốc 
Việt Nam đất nước con người 
Best in Korea
Mỗi ngày một làn điệu
Cafe tối 
Bệ phóng âm nhạc

VTC11

Phim hoạt hình
Ai thông minh hơn
Nhìn hình đoán chữ
Music 4 kids
Đấu giá 1000
Tôi yêu nhà tôi
Game tương tác
Nào mình cùng đi
Dạy Tiếng Việt cơ bản
Thi tài cùng họa sĩ Đốm
Bầu trời bé thơ
Bé yêu kể chuyện cổ tích
Ella chào Việt Nam 
Một ngày của PoPoDoo
Đoàn tàu kỳ diệu
Em yêu biển đảo quê hương 
Những que diêm thông minh
Hát cùng họa mi 
Kids&Family news
Bàn tay có phép lạ
Bé yêu học hát
Đoán giá đúng
Quà tặng âm nhạc
KidsTV tương tác
Chiếc xe âm nhạc
Happy Birthday
Chúng em làm chiến sĩ
Gặp gỡ cuối năm
Nào mình cùng đi
Thì ra là thế
Nhí tài năng
Ngại gì không nói
Thứ sáu cùng AU
Sách hay của bé
Fun with English
Theo bước con yêu
Ống kính biết tuốt
Đôi tay xinh
Ảo thuật cùng J
Khu vườn trí tuệ
Bàn tròn nhí
Thế giới diệu kỳ – C’est pas sorcier
Vòng quay lịch sử
Vừng ơi mở ra
Những câu chuyện cô tiên xanh
Vui học Toán
Kể chuyện danh nhân thế giới
Ống kính biết tuốt
Đuổi hình bắt chữ
Nhìn hình bắt chữ
Thử thách rừng xanh
Hoạt hình Jetix
Những nốt nhạc ngộ nghĩnh
Bước khởi đầu cho nhà vô địch
Chúng em làm chiến sĩ 
Sữa học đường
Tớ làm truyền hình
Họa sĩ tí hon
Hát cùng hoạ mi
Bàn tròn nhí 
Mặt trời bé con
Công viên vui vẻ
Câu đố dân gian 
Thi tài tiếng Anh
Cùng bé yêu tỏa sáng
Bí ẩn những ô số 
Hộp quà bí ẩn

VTC

Phim hoạt hình
Lớp học không khoảng cách

VTC12
Phát lại chương trình của VTC

Alo Homeshopping

Chương trình mua sắm

SETV
Ca nhạc

VTCK, K2V

BTOB – Những chàng trai hoàn hảo
Ăn kiêng cùng người nổi tiếng
Đại nhạc hội Busan
Kpop Ranking
Đẹp như sao Hàn
Nhà có khách
Thử đi rồi biết
Đột nhập trường học
Ẩm thực cho Hội độc thân
Thách thức siêu đầu bếp

VTC13

iTV

Admin's Playlist 
Beat Up
Ca nhạc quốc tế
Ca nhạc Việt Nam
Bản tin Ốc sên
Chocolate iMusic
Ekip 3i (iMusic – iDea – iDol -)
Ekip 3i+
Lovely Alphabet
iChat
iCover 
iGame
ILove Ballads 
iMusic 1 in 3
iMusic Top Hits (Việt Nam/Quốc tế)
iMusic Update (Việt Nam/Quốc tế, tiền thân của iTV Now)
iRing Top Hits
iTV Now (Việt Nam/Quốc tế)
iTV Rapnews
iTV Remix
iTV Fanmade
iMusic Việt Nam
iMusic Quốc tế
Music Face
Sao trên iTV
V-pop Album

VTC13 4K (VOV)

Top Ring Tunes
iMusic Radio cuối tuần
Giờ cao điểm
Thông tin, thống kê về diễn biến đại dịch COVID-19
Chứng khoán 
Thời sự sáng VOV1
Khám phá tự nhiên – xã hội
Âm nhạc và cuộc sống

VTC14

Hồ sơ X
Tôi và sự kiện
Khoảnh khắc hiểm nguy
Phim cuối tuần
Môi trường & sức khỏe
Nhật ký cuộc sống
Bản tin Thời tiết
Thời tiết Đô thị
Thời tiết cuối ngày
Thời tiết biển
Thời tiết Nông vụ
Thời tiết Du lịch
Cuộc sống 24H
Giao thông an toàn
Góc nhìn khán giả
Góc nhìn cuộc sống
Chào Buổi tối
Thế giới 7 ngày
Chuyện đông chuyện tây
Môi trường và sức khỏe
Ngon và lành
Nhà mát
Cuộc chiến ung thư
Sống chung với lũ
Biển bạc
Biển đảo Việt Nam
Nhịp sống đỏ
114
115
4 Tại chỗ
Việt Nam xanh
Nhiệt kế thị trường 
Tri thức người xưa
Thiên nhiên nổi giận
Thiên nhiên Việt Nam
Hành tinh xanh
Hiểm họa quanh ta
Trái đất trong tay em
Thế giới xe xanh
Tình huống nguy hiểm - Thử thách khắc nghiệt
Cận cảnh
Thử thách khắc nghiệt 
Chùa Việt Nam 
Dòng chảy cuộc sống 
Biển đảo Việt Nam 
Cùng toàn dân phòng cháy chữa cháy
Năng lượng hiệu quả
Phong thủy và cuộc sống

VTC16

Hiệu suất vàng
Hỏi biết trên đồng
Tổng đài nông nghiệp 
Sửc khỏe sinh sản
Hành trình rẻo cao
Khuyến nông
Đối thoại chính sách tam nông
Tam nông
Dự án thăm vườn
Cuộc sống nhà nông
Nhất nghệ tinh
Khuyến nông Hà Nội
Người làng ra phố
Văn hóa nông thôn
Nông dân anh là ai
Tre xanh
Chuyện của làng
Đất Phương Nam
Chuyện rẻo cao
Luật về làng
Dự án thăm vườn 
Sức khỏe vàng
Hỏi bác sĩ chuyên khoa
Tư vấn sức khỏe 
Nhà nông làm giàu
Khoa học nông nghiệp
Sức khỏe nhà nông
Thời tiết Biển & Ngư trường
Con đường làm giàu
Thị trường Nông sản trong tuần
Nông thôn xanh
Hướng nghiệp nhà nông
Thư khán giả 
Chuyện của làng
Đọc báo giúp nhà nông
Thời sự nông thôn
Nông thôn chuyển động
Nông nghiệp 24h
Khởi nghiệp
Hãy hỏi để biết
Từ nông thôn nhìn ra thế giới
Sao thần nông
Mách nhỏ nhà nông
Nông thôn mới
Nhà nông tin dùng
Thị trường nông sản
Cùng nông dân hội nhập 
Tư vấn nông nghiệp trực tuyến
Cùng nông dân ra đồng
Bản tin 3 sạch
Mách nhỏ nhà nông
Thuốc nam cho người Việt 
Chuyện bàn trà
Chuyện của làng 
Chúng ta đang ăn gì
Hỏi đáp trong ngày
Thị trường nông sản cuối tuần
Nông sản cuối tuần
Bà con ơi!
Sắc màu cuộc sống 
Lá lành đùm lá rách 
Sách cho nông dân
Văn bản chính sách pháp luật mới về Nông nghiệp - Nông thôn
Bản tin chính sách, việc làm cho nông thôn
Nông thôn mới
Chuyện trong xóm ngoài làng
Trang chăn nuôi
Chuyện của làng
Điểm báo
Bản tin thị trường nông sản
Cười
Hướng nghiệp nhà nông
Bản tin thời sự nông thôn
Nông nghiệp và công nghiệp hóa 
Trang thủy sản
Trả lời thư khán giả 
Giữ gìn các làn điệu dân ca
Trang cây trồng
Tổng hợp tin tức trong ngày
Bạn của đất
Thương hiệu nhà nông
Phim tài liệu nông thôn
Đưa thông tin về cơ sở
Dự báo ngư trường
Dự báo duyên hải 
Nông thôn và biến đổi khí hậu
Mách nghề nông nghiệp 
Thời tiết nông vụ
Hài
Nông lịch và thời tiết
Nông vụ và thời tiết 
Nông vụ và thời tiết - Duyên hải
Nông vụ và thời tiết - Thời tiết nông vụ
Dân ca và nhạc cổ truyền 
Nông vụ và thời tiết - ngư trường 
Họ đã sản xuất như thế nào?
Tìm về với dân ca 
Bếp hồng
Hợp tác xã
Nông nghiệp 24h

Defunct Channels

VTC HD1 & HDVIP1

Chân dung âm nhạc
Hồ sơ văn hóa Việt
Music Faces
Nét Hà thành
Chân dung số 6
Phong & Thủy
Phim tài liệu
Thế giới động vật
Vip Talk
Chuyện ngôi sao
TV 24h
Cô ấy đẹp
Phong cách đàn ông 
Sao và xe
5 sao

VTC HD2 & HDVIP 2

Phim truyện 
Tường thuật bóng đá

VTC HD3 & HDVIP 3
Sành điệu
Xa lộ âm nhạc
Không gian sống
Tạp chí tuổi teen
Đẹp cùng bạn
Gửi lời yêu thương
Gương mặt trang bìa

VTC HD Thể thao
Tạp chí thể thao
Tường thuật thể thao
Chân dung danh thủ
Tạp chí các môn thể thao dưới nước
Tạp chí điền kinh quốc tế
Tạp chí thế giới thể dục dụng cụ

VTC HD7

VTC HD9

CEC General

CEC HD Phim

VTC HD M&D
Chương trình tổng hợp

VTC HD1 4K
Khám phá thế giới 
Hòa nhạc thính phòng

Other

New Year programs

Hội xuân văn nghệ sĩ 
Xuân phát tài
Táo quân
Trang thơ xuân
Cầu truyền hình đặc biệt chào xuân
Âm nhạc và thời trang
10 sự kiện nổi bật
Những sự kiện văn hóa nổi bật
Bản tin đặc biệt
Dự đoán phong thủy năm mới
Diễn xướng hầu đồng
Khoảnh khắc giao thừa
Việt Nam 24h

Sports event

Nhật ký Seagames/Asiad/Olympic/Copa America/Euro/World Cup/King's Cup
Bình luận bóng đá
Toàn cảnh Seagames/Euro/World Cup/Olympic...

See also
List of programme broadcast by Vietnam Television paytv
List of programmes broadcast by HTV
List of programmes broadcast by VTV
List of programmes broadcast by Hanoi Radio Television
List of programmes broadcast by THVL

References

Vietnam
Vietnamese television series